is a Japanese professional shogi player ranked 7-dan.

Early life
Toyokawa was born in Suginami, Tokyo on February 20, 1967. In December 1982, he entered the Japan Shogi Association's apprentice school at the rank 6-kyū under the guidance of shogi professional . He was promoted to the rank of 1-dan in 1985, and obtained full professional status and the rank of 4-dan in October 1991.

Promotion history
Toyokawa's promotion history is as follows:
 6-kyū: 1982
 1-dan: 1985
 4-dan: October 1, 1991
 5-dan: February 27, 1996
 6-dan: May 22, 2002
 7-dan: March 19, 2009

References

External links
ShogiHub: Professional Player Info · Toyokawa, Takahiro

Japanese shogi players
Living people
Professional shogi players
Professional shogi players from Tokyo
1967 births
People from Suginami